The Americas Zone was one of three Zones of Davis Cup competition in 2002.

Group I

Mexico relegated to Group II in 2003.
Venezuela and Canada advance to World Group Play-off.

Group II

Guatemala and Trinidad and Tobago relegated to Group III in 2003.
Peru promoted to Group I in 2003.

Group III

Participating Teams
 — relegated to Group IV in 2003
 — promoted to Group II in 2003

 — promoted to Group II in 2003

 — relegated to Group IV in 2003

Group IV

Participating Teams

 — promoted to Group III in 2003

 — promoted to Group III in 2003

References

See also

 
Americas
Davis Cup Americas Zone